Shahid Abdul Salam Thahim is a Pakistani politician who had been a Member of the Provincial Assembly of Sindh, from May 2013 to May 2018.

Early life and education
He was born on 12 January 1972.

He has a degree of Bachelor of Engineering in Civil Technology from Mehran University of Engineering and Technology and a Master of Arts from Sindh University.

Political career

He was elected to the Provincial Assembly of Sindh as a candidate of Pakistan Peoples Party (PPP) from Constituency PS-83 SANGHAR-VI in 2013 Pakistani general election.

He was re-elected to Provincial Assembly of Sindh as a candidate of PPP from Constituency PS-45 (Sanghar-V) in 2018 Pakistani general election.

References

Living people
Sindh MPAs 2013–2018
1972 births
Pakistan People's Party MPAs (Sindh)
Sindh MPAs 2018–2023